Ghatail is a town of Ghatail Upazila, Tangail, Bangladesh.

Demographics
According to the 2011 Bangladesh census, Ghatail town had 7,668 households and a population of 35,245.

The literacy rate (age 7 and over) was 72.1% (Male-77.6%, Female-65.1%).

References

Populated places in Dhaka Division
Populated places in Tangail District
Pourashavas of Bangladesh